Lauras Stern (Laura's Star) was a German animated children's television series.

See also
 List of German television series

Sources

External links
 

Television shows based on children's books
German children's animated television series
2002 German television series debuts
2011 German television series endings
German-language television shows